The 1984 NSL Cup was the eighth season of the NSL Cup, which was the main national association football knockout cup competition in Australia. All 24 NSL teams from around Australia entered the competition.

Group stage

Group 1

Group 2

Group 3

Group 4

Group 5

Group 6

Ranking of second-placed teams

Knockout stage

Bracket

Quarter-finals

Semi-finals

Final

References

NSL Cup
1984 in Australian soccer
NSL Cup seasons